Fuck It may refer to:

 "Fuck It (I Don't Want You Back)", a song by American pop/R&B singer Eamon
 Fuck It, We'll Do It Live, a live album by American horror punk musician Wednesday 13
 "Fuck It", a song by Seether from Disclaimer II
 "Fuck It", a song by Dune Rats
 "Fxxk It", a song by South Korean boy band Big Bang from Made
 An exclamation using the word "fuck"

See also
 Fuck off (disambiguation)
 Fuck you (disambiguation)
 Fuck It, I Love You (disambiguation)
 We'll do it live (disambiguation)
 Phuket